Stefano Zoff (born 17 March 1966 in Monfalcone) is an Italian lightweight boxer from Monfalcone, Friuli-Venezia Giulia, Italy. In 1999 he won the WBA lightweight title.

References

External links

1966 births
Living people
People from Monfalcone
Italian male boxers
Lightweight boxers
Sportspeople from Friuli-Venezia Giulia